The 2007 Auckland City mayoral election was part of the New Zealand local elections held that same year. In 2007, elections were held for the Mayor of Auckland plus other local government positions including nineteen city councillors. The polling was conducted using the standard first-past-the-post electoral method.

Background
The election saw one-term Mayor Dick Hubbard defeated by his predecessor John Banks. Hubbard was the third consecutive mayor voted out after only one term and Banks became the first former mayor of Auckland to reclaim the position since Dove-Myer Robinson in 1968.

This was to be the last election for municipal offices to the Auckland City Council. By 2010 it had merged to become part of the new Auckland Council. Banks stood for the newly created office of Mayor of Auckland but lost to former mayor of Manukau City Len Brown.

Mayoralty results
The following table gives the election results:

Ward results

Candidates were also elected from wards to the Auckland City Council.

References

Mayoral elections in Auckland
2007 elections in New Zealand
Auckland City Council
2000s in Auckland
October 2007 events in New Zealand